Dalga is a town of about 120,000 people in Minya Governorate in Egypt. About 20,000 Christians live there. It was occupied by Islamists on July 3, 2013, the day Mohamed Morsi was deposed from power by the Egyptian military. On the day the Islamists assumed control the police were driven out; two attempts by the Egyptian military to take the town during the summer of 2013 failed. Egyptian police retook the town in a pre-dawn attack September 16, 2013. Dalga is notable for being the original residence of Abba Or of Nitria.

Under Islamist rule the ancient Coptic Christian Monastery of the Virgin Mary and St. Abraam was looted and burned as were the Catholic and Anglican churches; Christians were terrorized.

Climate
Köppen-Geiger climate classification system classifies its climate as hot desert (BWh).

Notes and references

Populated places in Minya Governorate